Pomaderris reperta, commonly known as Denman pomaderris, is a species of flowering plant in the family Rhamnaceae and is endemic to a restricted area of New South Wales. It is a shrub with densely rusty-hairy new growth, egg-shaped to elliptic leaves, and dense panicles of cream-coloured flowers.

Description
The upper surface of the leaves is covered with short, velvety hairs and the lower surface is densely covered with white or greyish, star-shaped hairs.

Taxonomy
Pomaderris reperta was first formally described in 1997 by Neville Grant Walsh and Fiona Coates in the journal Muelleria from specimens collected by Peter Craig Jobson near Denman in 1995. The specific epithet (reperta) means "to rediscover", referring its not having been seen between 1961 and 1995.

Distribution and habitat
Denman pomaderris grows in woodland on soil derived from sandstone near Denman in the upper Hunter Valley of New South Wales.

Conservation status
Pomaderris reperta is listed as "critically endangered" under the Australian Government Environment Protection and Biodiversity Conservation Act 1999 and the New South Wales Government Biodiversity Conservation Act 2016. The main threats to the species include its small population size and limited distribution and drought.

References

Flora of New South Wales
reperta
Plants described in 1997
Taxa named by Neville Grant Walsh